Juyongguan railway station is a railway station in Beijing, near the Juyongguan section of Great Wall.

Stations on the Beijing–Baotou Railway
Railway stations in Beijing